John Lester Miller (March 24, 1901 – July 20, 1978) was a United States district judge of the United States District Court for the Western District of Pennsylvania.

Education and career

Born in Pittsburgh, Pennsylvania, Miller received a Bachelor of Science degree from Westminster College in 1923 and a Bachelor of Laws from the University of Pittsburgh School of Law in 1926. He was in private practice in Pittsburgh from 1926 to 1954.

Federal judicial service

On March 29, 1954, Miller was nominated by President Dwight D. Eisenhower to a seat on the United States District Court for the Western District of Pennsylvania vacated by Judge William Alvah Stewart. Miller was confirmed by the United States Senate on May 18, 1954, and received his commission on May 20, 1954. He assumed senior status on October 1, 1971, serving in that capacity until his death on July 20, 1978.

References

Sources
 

1901 births
1978 deaths
Westminster College (Pennsylvania) alumni
University of Pittsburgh School of Law alumni
Judges of the United States District Court for the Western District of Pennsylvania
United States district court judges appointed by Dwight D. Eisenhower
20th-century American judges
20th-century American lawyers
Lawyers from Pittsburgh